As a way to honor key contributors including players, coaches, fans, broadcasters and announcers, National Basketball Association (NBA) teams often retire their jersey numbers, win totals or microphones. In the case of jersey numbers, they are usually no longer available for future players to wear, although they can ask for permission from players whose jerseys are retired. Teams usually display these numbers by hanging banners on the rafters inside their home arena. As of 2022, only two teams in the NBA do not have any retired numbers: the Los Angeles Clippers and the Toronto Raptors. Two players have had their numbers retired by teams they did not play for, and only one player (Bill Russell) had his number retired league-wide.

List
Key

Honored numbers
Cleveland has introduced in 2019 a Wall of Honor, which honors former players and other personnel.

Phoenix has honored some players in the Suns Ring of Honor without retiring their numbers.

The Lakers have also honored their most notable players during the stint of the franchise in Minneapolis. Although their numbers are displayed on the banners, only the No. 22 and No. 34 are officially retired, since they were retired for Elgin Baylor and Shaquille O'Neal respectively.

Retired by multiple teams
A handful of players who had notable careers for multiple teams have had their numbers retired by each team. Two players have had their numbers retired by teams they never played for.

Kareem Abdul-Jabbar had his no. 33 retired by both the Bucks and Lakers.
Wilt Chamberlain had his no. 13 retired by the Warriors, 76ers, and Lakers. To date, he is one of only two players to have his jersey retired by 3 different teams, alongside Pete Maravich.
Clyde Drexler had his no. 22 retired by both the Trail Blazers and Rockets.
Julius Erving had his no. 32 retired by the Nets, and his no. 6 retired by the 76ers.
Elvin Hayes had his no. 11 retired by the Wizards. The Rockets announced that his no. 44 will be retired on November 18, 2022.
Michael Jordan had his no. 23 retired by both the Bulls and Heat. Jordan is one of two players to have his jersey retired by a team he never played for, alongside Pete Maravich.
Bob Lanier had his no. 16 retired by both the Pistons and Bucks.
Pete Maravich had his no. 44 retired by the Hawks, while his no. 7 is retired by both the Jazz and Pelicans. Maravich is one of two players to have his jersey retired by 3 different teams, alongside Wilt Chamberlain; he is also one of two players to have his jersey retired by a team he never played for, alongside Michael Jordan.
Moses Malone has his no. 24 retired by the Rockets, while his no. 2 is retired by the 76ers.
Earl Monroe had his no. 15 retired by the Knicks, and his no. 10 by the Wizards.
Dikembe Mutombo had his no. 55 retired by both the Nuggets and Hawks.
Shaquille O'Neal had his no. 34 retired by the Lakers, and his no. 32 by the Heat.
Oscar Robertson had his no. 14 retired by the Kings, and his no. 1 by the Bucks.
Bill Russell had his no. 6 retired league-wide, the first and thus far only NBA player to receive the honor.
Jerry Sloan had his no. 4 retired by the Bulls, and no. 1,223 by the Jazz, signifying his total victories as their coach.
Nate Thurmond had his no. 42 retired by both the Warriors and Cavaliers.
Lenny Wilkens had his no. 19 retired by the Sonics, and his name appears in the Cavaliers' Wall of Honor.

Retired in honor of multiple players
The following numbers have been retired in honor of multiple players:
 New York Knicks' no. 15 retired for Earl Monroe in 1986 and Dick McGuire in 1992.
 Portland Trail Blazers' no. 30 retired for Bob Gross and Terry Porter in 2008.

Retired in honor of one player
The following numbers have been retired in honor of one player:
Los Angeles Lakers' nos. 8 and 24 retired for Kobe Bryant in 2017.

See also
 50 Greatest Players in NBA History
 List of NCAA men's basketball retired numbers

Notes

References
General

Specific

Retired numbers
 
National Basketball Association